LaMarr Vernon Greer (born May 16, 1976) is a high school McDonald's All American and retired American basketball player. After short stints in the United States Basketball League and the International Basketball League, he embarked on a professional career in Europe. Greer retired in 2013.

Greer grew up in Middle Township, New Jersey. He attended Overbrook High School and transferred to Middle Township High School during his junior year, leading the school's basketball team to win the NJSIAA Group II state championships in both 1993 and 1994. In the 1994 season Greer was recognized as a McDonald's All American and New Jersey High School Player of the Year. He also participated in the Roundball Classic, ending the game with a double-double of 16 points and 10 assists. He has the most points in Middle Township High School history.

Greer has a son, Corey Greer, who plays Varsity basketball for well-known high school basketball team, Camden Panthers. Greer also is well known around the area for his commitment for youth. He does daily workouts with the youth during the high school basketball team off-season. Greer is now a teacher and the head basketball coach at his alma mater.

References

External links
Profile on realgm.com
Profile on fibaeurope.com

1976 births
Living people
American expatriate basketball people in Cyprus
American expatriate basketball people in Finland
American expatriate basketball people in Greece
American expatriate basketball people in Germany
American expatriate basketball people in Israel
American expatriate basketball people in Italy
American expatriate basketball people in Russia
American expatriate basketball people in Ukraine
Atlantic City Seagulls players
Baltimore Bayrunners players
Basketball Löwen Braunschweig players
Basketball players from New Jersey
BC Kyiv players
BC UNICS players
Florida State Seminoles men's basketball players
Middle Township High School alumni
People from Middle Township, New Jersey
Shooting guards
Sportspeople from Cape May County, New Jersey
Trenton Shooting Stars players
American men's basketball players